Kelly Edwards (born 9 January 1991) is a British judoka from Telford, Shropshire.

Judo career
Edwards came to prominence in 2007 after she became champion of Great Britain, winning the extra-lightweight division at the British Judo Championships.

Her Great British international debut came in 2010 in Vienna, where she took seventh place in the European Judo Championships, aged only 19. In 2011, Edwards won gold in the European Cup in Málaga in the under 48kg class and also won her second British title at extra-lightweight.

In 2012, she again won gold in the British Open European Cup in Crawley. In June 2012, Edwards was chosen to represent Great Britain in the 2012 Summer Olympics in London in the under 48 kg event, she was eliminated by Tomoko Fukumi.

In 2013, she won her third British title at the heavier weight of half-lightweight before representing England at the 2014 Commonwealth Games, in Glasgow, in the under 52kg class, where she won the silver medal, losing in the final to Louise Renicks on an indirect hansoku-make (for a fourth and final shido penalty) with 3 seconds remaining on the clock.

In 2015, she won her fourth and last British title.

References

External links
 
 
 

Living people
1990 births
Judoka at the 2012 Summer Olympics
Olympic judoka of Great Britain
People from Telford
English female judoka
Commonwealth Games medallists in judo
Commonwealth Games silver medallists for England
Judoka at the 2014 Commonwealth Games
European Games competitors for Great Britain
Judoka at the 2015 European Games
Medallists at the 2014 Commonwealth Games